Aykhal Airport is a public airport in the Sakha Republic, Russia, serving the settlement of Aykhal.

References

Airports in the Sakha Republic